Roohangiz Saminejad (24 June 1916 – 3 April 1997) was an Iranian actress. She is famous in Iran for playing the heroine Golnar in Lor Girl (1934), which was the first film made in the Persian language, making her the first Iranian film star in a talkie film.

Roohangiz Saminejad was not a professional actress. She was the wife of an employee of the film company. She was discovered by Abdolhossein Sepenta, who had almost despaired of finding an actress with the right look for the film.  Her strong Kermani accent required some changes to the script to account for it.

She only made one more film, Shirin and Farhad, also produced by Sepenta. According to Hamid Reza Sadr, she suffered social ostracism in the conservative culture of the time for becoming an actress. She also experienced sexual harassment from men when she went out in public. She had to change her name and lived in anonymity and seclusion.

References

External links
 

Iranian actresses
1916 births
1997 deaths
People from Tehran
Iranian film actresses
People from Kerman Province
20th-century Iranian actresses